This article lists political parties in the Canary Islands.

The parties

Most of the Spanish political parties are active in the Canary Islands. In addition are the following regional parties:

People's Alternative for the Canary Islands (Alternativa Popular Canaria)
Azarug
Canarian Assembly (Asamblea Canaria)
Canarian Coalition (Coalición Canaria) 
Canary Islands Independence Movement (Movimiento por la Autodeterminación e Independencia del Archipiélago Canario)
Canarian Nationalist Alternative (Alternativa Nacionalista Canaria)
Canarian Nationalist Party
Canarian People's Union (Unión del Pueblo Canario)
Canarian United Left
Communist Cells (Células Comunistas)
Communist Party of the Canaries (Partido Comunista de Canarias)
Democratic Arucasian Union (Unión Aruquense Democrática)
Inekaren (Organización Revolucionaria de Jóvenes Canarios Los Alzados)
National Congress of the Canaries (Congreso Nacional de Canarias)
New Canarias (Nueva Canarias)
Party of Communist Unification in the Canaries (Partido de Unificación Comunista en Canarias)
Popular Front of the Canary Islands (Frente Popular de las Islas Canarias)
Socialist Canarian Party (Partido Canario Socialista)
Unity of the People (Unidad del Pueblo)

See also
 List of political parties by country

Canary Islands
 
Political parties